Tahir Meha (10 October 1943  – 13 May 1981) was an Albanian political activist who was opposed to the Yugoslav regime in Kosovo. He is best known for having refused to surrender his weapon as two Yugoslav police officers encountered him at the market in Prekaz. He later died in an armed confrontation with Yugoslav special forces that included several tanks and helicopters. He became an important figure in Kosovar-Albanian folklore as a symbol against Yugoslav rule.

Life and death
Meha came from a patriotic family from Prekaz, Drenica that was known among Albanians for owning the kulla of Mehajve in Nebihu. According to Albanian folklore, Meha was shopping at the market as usual when two Yugoslav police officers spotted the pistol at his waist and demanded he surrender it, to which Meha refused. When the officers threatened him, Meha opened fire and the fighting began. According to Yugoslav media, Meha killed nine police officers and wounded two before he himself was wounded.

Tahir then fled the scene and headed back to this house. Soon after, Yugoslav forces pursued him, responding with tanks and helicopters. Tahir was joined by his father to assist him. When a friend of Meha asked him to surrender his weapon, Meha said "I refuse to surrender to the Serb," and stayed in his home. His father stayed with him in the house and the police siege began at 10pm, lasting a total of 22 hours. They were surrounded by three battalions to ensure that Meha would be unable to escape. When the tanks opened fire, the wall of his house collapsed, however, Meha managed to throw a hand grenade into the cabin of the tank, damaging it severely. When Meha continued forward, he was noticed by the spotlights of the Yugoslav forces and fired upon. Meha was found the next morning with 8 bullets in his body and was carried away by locals.

Cause of refusal to surrender his gun
Meha's grandfather, Emin Lati (1892-1974), was a member of the Kaçak movement of Azem Bejta during the Albanian fight for freedom against Serbia during the 1920s. After Azem Bejta's death in 1924, Emin Lati kept Bejta's revolver, hiding it until 1941 when he gave it to Nebihu, his son (1910-1981). The gun was kept by Nehibu, who used it during World War II while fighting alongside Shaban Polluzha. Eventually, after the war, he gave it to his son, Tahir Meha, who used it in the fight against Yugoslav forces. The reason Meha refused to hand over the revolver was because it had once belonged to Azem Bejta, and was venerated by Albanians.

Legacy
Meha became a rallying figure during the decade as a symbol of Albanian/Kosovar liberation against Yugoslav rule, and was much celebrated by several important figures and political leaders. He is buried in Prekaz and what remains of his kulla has the Albanian flag attached to it as a symbol of freedom.

References

1943 births
1981 deaths
Albanian activists
Political activists